Buongiorno, a NTT Docomo Company, develops apps and services for mobile devices.

In August 2012, after the settlement of a successful public tender offer, Buongiorno became a wholly owned subsidiary of NTT Docomo, a mobile telecommunications technologies and services company.

History 
Buongiorno started out in 1995 when current chairman Mauro Del Rio started sending humorous e-mail messages with the subject "Buongiorno" (Italian for "good day") to 11 friends. The business expanded quickly and by 1998 he was sending e-mail newsletters to 25,000 people. Del Rio  launched Buongiorno SpA to provide services for the telecommunications market, beginning a policy of growth through international acquisitions, the first of which was of the Spanish company MyAlert in 2001. Buongiorno merged with Vitaminic in July 2003 to form Buongiorno Vitaminic SpA. The company continued with its policy of acquisitions, the most significant of which were the Italian company Gsmbox in 2004, and the French company Freever leading in mobile communities and created by Jerome Trainel, Philippe Tissot, and Pierre Duhau-Laurent in 2005.

On March 25, 2006, the company changed its name to Buongiorno SpA.

More recent acquisitions which led to the current structure of the Buongiorno group were the British firm Inventa which was purchased at the end of 2006 and the American company Rocket Mobile in the early months of 2007. A significant partnership was established with the Mitsui corporation of Japan, creating the joint venture Buongiorno Hong Kong, managed by Simone Ranucci Brandimarte. The partnership's first major transaction was the acquisition of eDong Asia, a Chinese provider of mobile content.
On June 11, 2010, the company announced its investment in Glamoo, company leader in the group buying  ("collective buying") sector and headquartered in London.
In July 2012, Japan's NTT Docomo took over Buongiorno in a deal worth 209 million euros.

Financial information

As reported on the balance sheet dated 31 December 2006, the Buongiorno group has a consolidated investment of about €157.2 million, with a net worth of around €76.9 million, a consolidated turnover of about €191.8 million and consolidated net profit of about €12.6 million.

Investment in the parent company amounts to approximately €124.2 million, with a net worth of around €76.9 million, a turnover of about €50.5 million  and a net profit of about €13.8 million, with extraordinary income (capital gains on sale of shares) of about 10.9 million euros.

In 2006 the Buongiorno group employed on average 659 employees, including 173 staff in the parent company.

Controversy

In August 2012, Buongiorno featured in a BBC News Technology article exposing a loophole in the company's systems which allowed experienced hackers to sign up any mobile number to Buongiorno's subscription services, regardless of the mobile number's owner consent or knowledge. Buongiorno said it quickly closed the loophole once it was discovered and had no evidence it had been exploited.

References 

Software companies of Italy
NTT Docomo
2012 mergers and acquisitions